The Governor General of the Province of Canada was the viceregal post of the pre-Confederation Province of Canada that existed from 1840 to Canadian Confederation in 1867.

The post replaced the Governor General of New France and later Governor General of British North America, which had replaced that of Commander-in-Chief of British North America. With Confederation and the dissolution of the Province of Canada, a new post was created, that of Governor General of Canada.

During the duration seven individuals held this post, who were either colonial administrators of diplomats.

List

Residences
 Alwington House, Kingston: 1841-1844
 Château Ramezay, Montreal: 1844-1849
 Elmsley House, Toronto: 1849–1852
 Elmsley House, Toronto: 1856–1858

See also
 List of Governors General of Canada > Governors General of the Province of Canada, 1840-1867

Canada
Westminster system